Cecil Weld-Forester may refer to:

 Cecil Weld-Forester, 1st Baron Forester (1767–1828), British Member of Parliament and peer
 Cecil Weld-Forester, 5th Baron Forester (1842–1917), British peer and Member of Parliament